The 2021 Northeast Grand Prix was a sports car race sanctioned by the International Motor Sports Association (IMSA). The race was held at Lime Rock Park in Lakeville, Connecticut on July 17th, 2021. This race was the seventh round of the 2021 IMSA SportsCar Championship, and the fourth round of the 2021 WeatherTech Sprint Cup. 

Initially scheduled to run for two hours and 40 minutes, severe weather in the area caused just under 90 minutes of the event to be completed. Antonio García and Jordan Taylor scored overall victory for Corvette Racing; their fourth class victory of the season.

Background
The race marked IMSA's return to Lime Rock Park following the 2020 edition's cancellation due to the COVID-19 pandemic. As in previous years, the event was also the first GT-only round of the IMSA SportsCar Championship season, in which only the GTLM and GTD classes were scheduled to compete.

On July 8, 2021, IMSA released the latest technical bulletin outlining Balance of Performance for the event. In GTLM, after a 1-2 finish at the WeatherTech 240, the Corvette received a 10 kilogram weight increase. The Porsche, meanwhile, received a 20 kilogram weight break. No changes were made in GTD.

Entries

A total of 16 cars took part in the event, split across two classes. 3 cars were entered in GTLM, and 13 in GTD. 17 cars were featured on the pre-event entry list, and the final tally of 16 was reached following Alegra Motorsports' withdrawal due to sponsorship issues.

GTLM saw an identical entry list from the previous round at Watkins Glen, comprising the pair of Corvette Racing entries and the lone Porsche from WeatherTech Racing. In GTD, Gilbert Korthoff Motorsports didn't return after completing their planned single outing at Watkins Glen, while Pfaff Motorsports, Wright Motorsports, and Magnus Racing returned after skipping the most recent round, which only paid points towards the WeatherTech Sprint Cup.

Qualifying

Qualifying results

Results

References

External links

Northeast Grand Prix
Northeast Grand Prix
Northeast Grand Prix
Northeast Grand Prix